Goran Stanisavljević (born January 3, 1964) is a Serbian football manager and former player.

External links
 

1964 births
Living people
Serbian footballers
Serbian football managers
SV Ried players
SC Austria Lustenau players
FK Budućnost Podgorica players
SC Austria Lustenau managers

Association football midfielders